Alfred Benito "Al" Mancini (November 13, 1932 – November 12, 2007) was an American stage, television and film actor, born in Steubenville, Ohio.

Acting career

He was a 1950 graduate of London High School in London, Ohio.

In 1960, he appeared in Ted Flicker's improvisational group The Premise Off-Broadway, and transferred with the show to the Comedy Theatre in London's West End. From there, he graduated to writing and performing for the British satire show That Was the Week That Was (popularly known as TW3) on BBC television, for producer Ned Sherrin and David Frost. Staying in London for several years, his foremost film role was as Tassos Bravos in Robert Aldrich's The Dirty Dozen (1967), and he later reunited with one of his co-stars Ben Carruthers in the 1968 film To Grab the Ring. Also in 1967 he appeared as the Announcer in The Prisoner episode 'The General'. In 1970, he appeared as Lieutenant Andy Conroy in the UFO episodes "The Cat with Ten Lives" and "Mindbender". In 1974, on British television, he played Captain Harry Nugent in the second series of BBC's Colditz and Le Fevre in episode "Entente Cordiale" of Special Branch.

He returned to the United States in the mid-1970s, appearing in several films including Miller's Crossing (1990), Loose Cannons (1990), The Public Eye (1992) and Falling Down (1993). His last role, in 2005, was on an episode of Joan of Arcadia. He taught acting for over 30 years at the Beverly Hills Playhouse, and wrote for television.

Personal life
Mancini was married and divorced twice. He died of Alzheimer's disease on the day before his 75th birthday in London, Ohio.

Filmography

References

External links

1932 births
2007 deaths
Male actors from Ohio
American male film actors
American male stage actors
American male television actors
American television writers
American male television writers
Deaths from Alzheimer's disease
Neurological disease deaths in Ohio
American writers of Italian descent
People from Steubenville, Ohio
Screenwriters from Ohio
20th-century American male actors
20th-century American screenwriters
20th-century American male writers